MGM Television is an American television production/distribution company that was formed in 1955 by Metro-Goldwyn-Mayer under Loews, Inc. Today, MGM Television is a division of Metro-Goldwyn-Mayer Studios, Inc., an MGM company.

MGM Television

Pre-1985 shows 

This is a list of television series produced or distributed by MGM Television. Most of the first half is owned by Warner Bros. Discovery's Warner Bros. Television through Turner Entertainment Co. and the second is owned by MGM itself.

Note: (*) Denotes public domain.

 MGM Parade (1955–1956)
 The Thin Man (1957–1959)* (Based on the 1934 film and its sequels by MGM) (co-production with Clarington Productions)
 Northwest Passage (1958–1959)*
 National Velvet (1960–1962) (co-production with Velvet Productions)
 The Best of the Post (1960)
 The Islanders (1960–1961)
 The Asphalt Jungle (1961)
 Cain's Hundred (1961–1962) (co-production with Vandas Productions)
 Dr. Kildare (1961–1966) (Based on the 1937 movie Internes Can't Take Money and its sequels by MGM) (co-production with Arena Productions)
 Father of the Bride (1961–1962) (Based on the 1950 film and its sequel by MGM)
 Sam Benedict (1962–1963)
 The Eleventh Hour (1962–1964) (co-production with Arena Productions)
 The Lieutenant (1963–1964) (co-production with Arena Productions)
 Harry's Girls (1963)
 The Travels of Jaimie McPheeters (1963–1964)
 Mr. Novak (1963–1965)
 Flipper (1964–1967) (co-production with Ivan Tors Films)
 Made in America (1964)
 Many Happy Returns (1964–1965) (co-production with Lindabob Productions)
 The Man from U.N.C.L.E. (1964–1968) (co-production with Arena Productions)
 A Man Called Shenandoah (1965–1966) (co-production with Bronze Enterprises)
 Please Don't Eat the Daisies (1965–1967) (Based on the 1960 movie of the same name by MGM)
 Tom and Jerry (1965–1972)
 Daktari (1966–1969) (co-production with Ivan Tors Films)
 Preview Tonight (1966) (episode "Seven Good Years and Seven Lean")
 The Rounders (1966–1967)
 The Girl from U.N.C.L.E. (1966–1967) (co-production with Arena Productions)
 Jericho (1966–1967) (co-production with Arena Productions)
 The Forsyte Saga (1967) (mini)
 Off to See the Wizard (1967–1968) (Based on The Wizard of Oz)
 Hondo (1967) (Based on the 1953 film by Warner Bros.) (co-production with Batjac Productions and Fenady Associates, Inc.)
 Maya (1967–1968) (Based on the 1966 film by MGM) (co-production with King Bros. Productions)
 Then Came Bronson (1969–1970)
 The Courtship of Eddie's Father (1969–1972) (Based on the 1960 film by MGM)
 Medical Center (1969–1976) (co-production with Alfra Productions)
 Young Dr. Kildare (1972) 
 Assignment Vienna (1972)
 Hello Mother, Goodbye! (1973 pilot for NBC starring Bette Davis)
 Adam's Rib (1973) (Based on the 1949 film by MGM)
 Hawkins (1973–1974) (co-production with Arena Productions)
 The Tom and Jerry Show (1975) (in association with Hanna-Barbera Productions)
 Bronk (1975–1976) (co-production with Carnan-Becker Productions)
 The Practice (1976–1977) (co-production with Danny Thomas Productions)
 The Montefuscos (1975) (co-production with Persky-Denoff Enterprises)
 Jigsaw John (1976)
 Executive Suite (1976–1977)
 How the West Was Won (1977, 1978, 1979) (mini)
 CHiPs (1977–1983) (co-production with Rosner Television)
 Logan's Run (1977–1978) (Based on the 1976 film by MGM) (co-production with Goff-Roberts-Steiner Productions)
 Lucan (1977–1978)
 The French Atlantic Affair (1979) (mini)
 Beyond Westworld (1980) (co-production with Lou Shaw Productions)
 The Tom and Jerry Comedy Show (1980–1982) (co-production with Filmation Associates)
 The Tom and Jerry Hour (1981–1984) (in association with Filmation Associates)
 McClain's Law (1981–1982) (co-production with Eric Bercovici Productions)
 Chicago Story (1982) (co-production with Eric Bercovici Productions)
 Gavilan  (1982–1983) (co-production with Mandy Films)
 Meatballs & Spaghetti (1982) (produced by InterMedia Entertainment Company and Marvel Productions)
 Pandamonium (1982) (produced by Marvel Productions and InterMedia Entertainment Company)
 Gilligan's Planet (1982–1983) (in association with Filmation Associates)
 Seven Brides for Seven Brothers (1982–1983) (Based on the 1954 film by Metro-Goldwyn-Mayer (co-production with David Gerber Productions)
 Cutter to Houston (1983) (co-production with Cypress Point Productions)
 Thicke of the Night (1983) (co-production with InterMedia Entertainment Company, Thickovit Productions, Inc. and Metromedia Producers Corporation)
 The Yearing (1983–1985) (Based on the 1946 film by MGM) (produced by MK Company)
 Empire (1984)
 Jessie (1984) (co-production with Lindsay Wagner-David Gerber Productions)
 Mighty Orbots (1984–1985) (in association with Intermedia Entertainment and TMS Entertainment)

Note: Flipper, produced between 1964 and 1967, was later acquired by The Samuel Goldwyn Company, and is currently owned and distributed by the successor company, MGM Television, which originally produced the series.

Post-1985 shows 
{| class="wikitable sortable"
|-
! Title
! Years
! Network
! Notes
|-
| Fame || 1982–2003 || NBCSyndication || Based on the 1980 film by Metro Goldwyn Mayerco-production with Eilenna Productions
|-
| We Got It Made || 1983–1988 || NBC/Syndication || co-production with InterMedia Entertainment Company and The Farr Organization Inc. Later episodes co-production with Twenty Paws Productions and The Fred Silverman Company
|-
| George Washington || rowspan="2" | 1984 || CBS || Miniseries; co-production with David Gerber Productions
|-
| Paper Dolls || ABC || co-production with Mandy Films
|-
| Pink Panther and Sons || 1984–1985 || NBC || co-production with Hanna-Barbera Productions, and Mirisch-Geoffrey–DePatie-Freleng
|-
| Kids Incorporated || 1984–1994 || Syndication/Disney Channel || co-production with Lynch/Biller Productions (1984–1989), Hal Roach Studios (1985–1987), Lynch Entertainment (1991–1994) K-Tel Entertainment (1984), Qintex Entertainment (1988–1989) and RHI Entertainment (1991–1994)
|-
| Lady Blue || 1985–1986 || ABC || co-production with David Gerber Productions
|-
| The Twilight Zone || 1985–1989 || CBS/Syndication || A revival of the 1959 TV series by Cayuga Productions and CBS Productions; MGM/UA Television distributed the third seasonCurrently distributed by CBS Media Ventures
|-
| Jack and Mike || 1986–1987 || ABC || co-produced by David Gerber Productions
|-
| Karen's Song || 1987 || Fox
|-
| Hello Kitty's Furry Tale Theater || rowspan="2" | 1987–1988 || CBS || co-production with DIC Entertainment
|-
| Sea Hunt || Syndication || A revival of the 1958 TV series by Ziv Television Programs
|-
| thirtysomething || 1987–1991 || ABC || co-production with The Bedford Falls Company
|-
| Baby Boom || 1988–1989 || NBC || Based on the 1987 film by United Artists
|-
| In the Heat of the Night || 1988–1994 || NBC/CBS || Based on the 1967 film by United Artistsco-production with The Fred Silverman Company, Jadda Productions and Juanita Bartlett Productions
|-
| Group One Medical || rowspan="2" | 1988–1989 || Syndication ||
|-
| Knightwatch || ABC || co-production with Astor III Productions
|-
| Straight to the Heart || rowspan="2" | 1989 || Syndication ||
|-
| Dream Street || NBC || co-production with The Bedford Falls Company
|-
| The Young Riders || 1989–1992 || ABC || co-production with Ogiens/Kane Company
|-
| Against the Law || 1990–1991 || Fox || co-production with Sarabande Productions and Daniel H. Blatt Productions
|-
| Dark Shadows || 1991 || NBC || co-production with Dan Curtis ProductionsA revival of the 1966 TV series
|-
| James Bond Jr. || rowspan="2" | 1991–1992 || Syndication || co-production with United Artists, Mac B, Danjaq and Murakami-Wolf-SwensonDistributed by Claster Television and ad sales handled by Camelot Entertainment Sales
|-
| Mother Goose and Grimm || rowspan="2" | CBS || co-production with Tribune Media Services and Film RomanNo longer distributed by MGM; currently owned by the estate of Lee Mendelson
|-
| Grapevine || rowspan="2" | 1992 ||co-production with Corkscrew Productions and CBS Entertainment Productions
|-
| Nightmare Cafe || NBC || co-production with Wes Craven Films
|-
| The Pink Panther || 1993–1995 || Syndication || co-production with MGM Animation, United Artists and Mirisch-Geoffrey–DePatie-FrelengDistributed by Claster Television and ad sales handled by Camelot Entertainment Sales
|-
| The Outer Limits || 1995–2002 || Showtime/Sci Fi || A revival of the 1963 TV series by United Artists Television
|-
| LAPD: Life on the Beat || 1995–1999 || Syndication || co-produced by QRZ Media
|-
| Poltergeist: The Legacy || 1996–1999 || Showtime/Sci Fi || co-production with Pacific Motion Pictures and Trilogy Entertainment Group
|-
| All Dogs Go to Heaven: The Series || 1996–1999 || Syndication || co-production with MGM AnimationDistributed by Claster TelevisionBased on the 1989 film All Dogs Go to Heaven
|-
| Dead Man's Gun || 1997–1999 || Showtime
|-
| Stargate SG-1 || 1997–2007 || Showtime/Sci Fi || co-production with Double Secret Productions (entire run), Gekko Film Corp.  and Sony Pictures Television (season 9)Based on the 1994 film Stargate by MGM and Carolco
|-
| Fame L.A. || 1997–1998 || Syndication || co-production with Trilogy Entertainment Group
|-
| The Magnificent Seven || 1998–2000 || CBS || co-production with Trilogy Entertainment Group and The Mirisch CorporationBased on the 1960 film by United Artists
|-
| RoboCop: Alpha Commando || 1998–1999 || rowspan="3" | Syndication || co-production with MGM AnimationDistributed by The Summit Media GroupBased on the 1987 film RoboCop by Orion Pictures
|-
| The Lionhearts || 1998–2000 || co-production with Metro-Goldwyn-Mayer AnimationDistributed by Claster TelevisionBased on "Leo" the Lion
|-
| National Enquirer TV || 1999–2001 || co-production with Bogorad/Wyler Productions
|-
| Survivor || 2000–present || CBS || continued from UAMG Contentco-production with CBS Studios, CBS Eye Productions, Castaway Television Productions and Survivor Productions LLC
|-
| Sex Wars || 2000–2001 || Syndication || Distribution only; produced by Lighthearted Entertainment
|-
| Leap Years || 2001–2002 || rowspan="2" | Showtime || co-production with Temple Street Productions
|-
| Jeremiah || 2002–2004 || co-production with Lionsgate Television, Showtime Networks, Platinum Studios, Jeremiah Productions, Inc. and J. Michael Straczynski Productions
|-
| She Spies || 2002–2004 || NBC/Syndication || co-produced by Reno and Osborn Productions  and Gregory J. Bonann Tower 18 Productions 
|-
| Stargate Infinity || 2002–2003 || FoxDisney Channel FranceM6 || co-production with Les Studios Tex S.A.R.L. and DIC Entertainment
|-
| Chappelle's Show || 2003–2006 || Comedy Central || started television distribution in 2007
|-
| Dead Like Me || 2003–2005 || Showtime
|co-production with John Masius Productions
|-
| The Apprentice || 2004–2017 || NBC || continued from UAMG Contentco-production with Trump Productions (seasons 1–14)
|-
| Animal Atlas || 2004–2015 || Syndication || co-produced by Longneedle Entertainment; distributed by Debmar-Mercury until 2009
|-
| Stargate Atlantis || 2004–2009 || Sci Fi || co-production with Acme Shark and Sony Pictures Television (season 2)
|-
| The Apprentice UK || 2005–present || BBC Two/BBC One || continued from UMAG Contentco-production with Naked
|-
| The Contender || 2005–2018 || NBC/ESPN/NBCSN/Epix || continued from Mark Burnett Productionsco-production with DreamWorks Television (seasons 1–4), Rogue Productions (season 1), ESPN Original Entertainment (seasons 1–4) and Paramount Television (season 5)
|-
| Barbershop: The Series || 2005 || Showtime || co-production with State Street Pictures, International Famous Players, Radio Pictures Corporation and Cube VisionBased on the 2002 film Barbershop
|-
| Safari Tracks || 2005–2006 || Syndication || co-produced by Longneedle Entertainment; co-distributed by Debmar-Mercury until 2009
|-
| Dante's Cove || 2005–2007 || Here TV || distribution only
|-
| The Apprentice: You're Fired! || 2006–present || BBC Three/BBC Two || continued from UAMG Contentco-production with Naked
|-
| Sports Action Team || 2006–2007 || NBC O&Os/HDNet/Syndication|| produced by Towers Productions, Inc., NBC 5 Chicago and NBC Television Stations Division (2006); NBC Local Media (2007)  distribution only for season 2
|-
| Are You Smarter than a 5th Grader? || 2007–201120152019 || FoxSyndicationNickelodeon || continued from UAMG Contentco-production with Nickelodeon Productions, Hard Knocks South Productions and Zoo Productions
|-
| American Gladiators || rowspan="2" | 2008 || NBC || original series was produced and distributed by Samuel Goldwyn Television, the revival is an MGM Television production
|-
| Spaceballs: The Animated Series || G4 || based on the 1987 film by MGM
|-
| First Business || 2008–2014 || Syndication || distribution-only as part of This TV programming deal with program producer Weigel Broadcasting
|-
| Shark Tank || 2009–present || ABC || co-production with Sony Pictures Television StudiosBased on the SPT-owned format Dragon's Den.MGM produced only from season 7 onwards; seasons 1–6 co-produced by UAMG Content
|-
| Stargate Universe || 2009–2011 || Syfy || co-production with Acme Shark
|-
| Pink Panther and Pals || 2010 || Cartoon Network || co-production with Rubicon Studios
|-
| Cash Cab || 2010–2015 || Discovery Channel || syndicated repeats of Discovery Channel series
|-
| The Voice || 2011–present || NBC || co-production with Warner Horizon Unscripted Television and ITV Americacontinued from UAMG Content
|-
| Teen Wolf || 2011–2017 || MTV || co-production with MTV Production Development, First Cause, Inc., Adelstein Productions, Siesta Productions, Lost Marbles Television and DiGa VisionBased on the 1985 movie of the same name, its sequel, and the TV series by Atlantic Releasing Corporation
|-
| The Celebrity Apprentice Australia || 2011–2021 || Nine Network || continued from UAMG Contentco-production with Fremantle Australia (seasons 1–4) and Warner Bros. International Television Production (season 5)
|-
| Vikings || 2013–2020 || History (Canada) || co-production with Octagon Films and Take 5 Productions
|-
| Right This Minute || 2013–present || Syndication || co-produced by a consortium of station groups led by KTVU, San Francisco distribution of Right This Minute transferred to Disney Media Distribution in 2016
|-
| CeeLo Green's The Good Life || 2014 || TBS || distribution only; Produced by Emerald TV Productions and Rogue Atlas Productions
|-
| Fargo || 2014–present || FX || co-production with FXP, 26 Keys Productions, The Littlefield Company, Nomadic Pictures (2014–2017) and Mike Zoss Productions (2014–2015)Based on the 1996 film by Polygram Filmed Entertainment
|-
| Lucha Underground || 2014–2018 || El Rey Network || continued from UAMG Content
|-
| Beyond the Tank || rowspan="2" | 2015–2016 || rowspan="2" | ABC || continued from UAMG Contentco-production with Sony Pictures Television
|-
| 500 Questions || continued from UAMG Contentco-production with Warner Horizon Television
|-
| Coupled || 2016 || Fox || co-production with Grandma's House Entertainment
|-
| How'd You Get So Rich? UK || 2017 || Channel 4 || co-production with CPL Productions
|-
| The Handmaid's Tale || rowspan="2" | 2017–present || Hulu || co-production with Daniel Wilson Productions, Inc., Toluca Pictures (season 5-), The Littlefield Company and White Oak Pictures 
|-
| Beat Shazam || Fox || co-production with Apploff Entertainment and Shazam
|-
| Get Shorty || 2017–2019 || Epix || co-production with Holmes Quality YarnsBased on the 1995 film
|-
| Stargate Origins || rowspan="2" | 2018 || Stargate Command || co-production with United Artists Digital Studios and New Form
|-
| TKO: Total Knock Out || CBS || co-production with HartBeat Productions and Shaggy Entertainment
|-
| Condor || rowspan="2" | 2018–present || Audience/Epix || co-production with Skydance Television, Paramount Television Studios and Apophasis UnproductionsBased on the film Three Days of the Condor by Paramount Pictures and Dino De Laurentiis Corporation
|-
| Unprotected Sets || rowspan="2" | Epix || co-production with Push It Productions
|-
| The Truth About the Harry Quebert Affair || 2018 || co-production with Eagle Pictures, Muse Entertainment, Old Friends Productions, Barbary Films and RepērageMiniseries
|-
| Luis Miguel: The Series || 2018-2021 || Telemundo/Netflix || co-production with Gato Grande Productions
|-
| The World's Best || rowspan="3" | 2019 || CBS || co-production with Warner Horizon Television and Fulwell 73 Productions
|-
| Elvis Goes There || rowspan="4" | Epix || co-production with Wildline Entertainment and Zero Point Zero Production
|-
| Perpetual Grace, LTD || co-production with Escape Artists, Chi-Town Pictures, Elephant Pictures and FXP
|-
| Sex Life || 2019–2021 || rowspan="2" | co-production with Evolution Media
|-
| For Life || 2019–2020
|-
| Four Weddings and a Funeral || rowspan="2" | 2019 || Hulu || co-production with Universal Television, Kaling International, Philoment Media and 3 Arts EntertainmentBased on the 1994 film of the same name by PolyGram Filmed Entertainment
|-
| Mr. Mom || Vudu ||
|-
| Messiah || rowspan="4" | 2020 || Netflix || co-production with Think Pictures Inc. and Industry Entertainment Partners
|-
| Laurel Canyon || rowspan="2" | Epix || co-production with Jigsaw Productions, The Kennedy/Marshall Company, Amblin Television and Warner Music Entertainment
|-
| Helter Skelter: An American Myth || co-production with Invented By Girls, Rogue Atlas, Berlanti Productions and Warner Horizon Television
|-
| Country Ever After || Netflix || co-production with Evolution Media and Lightworkers Media
|-
| Clarice || 2021 || CBS || co-production with CBS Studios, Secret Hideout, Tiny Core of Rage Entertainment and The Elizabeth DiariesBased on the 1990 movie The Silence of the Lambs by Orion Pictures
|-
| The Apprentice: ONE Championship Edition || 2021–present || Netflix || co-production with ONE Studios and Refiney Media
|-
| The Big Shot with Bethenny || rowspan="3" | 2021 || HBO Max || co-production with Evolution Media and B Reality Productions
|-
| Fall River || rowspan="3" | MGM+ || co-production with Blumhouse Television and Pyramid Productions
|-
| Fiasco || co-production with Prologue Projects and Left/Right Productions
|-
| From || rowspan="4" | 2022–present || co-production with MGM+ Studios, Gozie AGBO and Midnight Radio
|-
| Vikings: Valhalla || Netflix || co-production with Metropolitan Films International, Toluca Pictures (season 2–) and History
|-
| Billy the Kid || MGM+ || co-production with MGM+ Studios, Amblin Television, One Big Picture and De Line Pictures
|-
| Generation Gap || ABC || co-production with Greengrass Productions, Kimmelot and Milojo Productions
|-
| Last Night || 2022 || Peacock || co-production with Make It Happen Studio, Re Invent Studio and Entertainment 360
|-
| Ring Nation || 2022–present || Syndication || co-production with Big Fish Entertainment and Ring
|-
| The Reunion || 2022 || France 2 || co-production with Make It Happen Studio, Rai Fiction, ZDF and France Télévisions
|-
| Wednesday || 2022–present || Netflix || co-production with Millar Gough Ink, Toluca Pictures and Tim Burton ProductionsBased on The Addams Family by Charles Addams
|-
| The Consultant || 2023 || rowspan="2" | Amazon Prime Video || co-production with Amazon Studios, 1.21 Films and Toluca Pictures
|-
| Harlan Coben's Shelter || TBA || co-production with Amazon Studios
|}

 MGM+ Studios 

 UAMG Content 
Formerly known as Mark Burnett Productions, One Three Media, and United Artists Media Group.

 United Artists Television 

 Ziv Television Programs 
 The Cisco Kid (1950–1956)
 Boston Blackie (1951–1953)
 The Unexpected (1952)
 Your Favorite Story (1953–1955)
 I Led Three Lives (1953–1956)
 Mr. District Attorney (1954–1955)
 Science Fiction Theatre (1955–1957)
 Highway Patrol (1955–1959)
 Dr. Christian (1956–1957)
 The Man Called X (1956–1957)
 West Point Story (1956–1957)
 Adventures at Scott Island (1957–1958)
 Harbor Command (1957–1958)
 Men of Annapolis (1957–1958)
 Target (1957–1958)
 Tombstone Territory (1957–1960)
 Dial 999 (1958–1959)
 Mackenzie's Raiders (1958–1959)
 The Rough Riders (1958–1959)
 Bat Masterson (1958–1961)
 Sea Hunt (1958–1961)
 Bold Venture (1959–1960)
 The Man and the Challenge (1959–1960)
 This Man Dawson (1959–1960)
 Lock-Up (1959–1961)
 Home Run Derby (1960) (co-production with Homer Productions)
 The Case of the Dangerous Robin (1960–1961)
 The Everglades (1961–1962)
 King of Diamonds (1961–1962)
 Ripcord (1961–1963)
 Keyhole (1962)

 The Cannon Group, Inc. 
 D.C. Follies (1987–1989) (co-production with Sid & Marty Krofft Pictures and Negative Entertainment)
 Nightmare Classics (1989)

 Orion Television 

 Filmways 

 American International Television 
 Sinbad Jr. and his Magic Belt (1965–1966) (co-production with Hanna-Barbera Productions, owned by Warner Bros.)
 Prince Planet (1965–1966)
 Johnny Sokko and His Flying Robot (1967–1968)
 Twiggy's Jukebox/Jukebox (1978–1980)

 Heatter-Quigley Productions 
 Video Village/Video Village Jr. (1960–1962)
 Double Exposure (1961)
 People Will Talk (1963)
 The Celebrity Game (1964)    
 Shenanigans (1964–1965)
 PDQ (1966–1969)
 Showdown (1966)
 Hollywood Squares (1966–1981)
 Temptation (1967–1968)
 Funny You Should Ask (1968–1969)
 Wacky Races (1968–1970, co-produced with Hanna-Barbera Productions, owned by Warner Bros.)
 Storybook Squares (1969; 1976–1977)
 Name Droppers (1969)
 Gambit (1972–1976)
 Runaround (1972–1973)
 Amateur's Guide to Love (1972)
 Baffle (1973)
 All-Star Baffle (1974)
 High Rollers (1974–1976; 1978–1980)
 The Magnificent Marble Machine (1975–1976)
 Hot Seat (1976)
 To Say the Least (1977–1978)
 Bedtime Stories (1979)
 Las Vegas Gambit (1980–1981)

 Samuel Goldwyn Television 

 PolyGram Filmed Entertainment 
 Teen Wolf (1986–1987) (produced by Southern Star/Hanna-Barbera Australia, Clubhouse Pictures (season 1) and Atlantic/Kushner-Locke (season 2))

 Fries Entertainment 

 Evolution Media 
Formerly known as Evolution Film & Tape. Evolution's programs are largely owned by other companies.

 Big Fish Entertainment 

 NBC Studios (international distribution) 
MGM Worldwide Television Distribution handles international distribution for the NBC Studios programs (produced between 1973 and 2004) listed below.

 Television films & specials 
 MGM Television Note: Warner Bros. Discovery's Warner Bros. Television owns pre-1981 television films via Turner Entertainment Co., while MGM owns post-1982 films.

 United Artists Television 
 The Ghost of Sierra de Cobre (1964)
 The Incredible World of James Bond (1965)
 Welcome to Japan, Mr. Bond (1967)
 Arsenic and Old Lace (1969)
 The Pink Panther in: A Pink Christmas (1978)
 The Pink Panther in: Olym-Pinks (1980)
 The Pink Panther in: Pink at First Sight (1981)
 Witness for the Prosecution (1982)
 I Take These Man (1983)
 I Want to Live (1983)
 James Bond: The First 25 Years (1983)

 The Cannon Group, Inc. 
 The Making of Death Wish 3 (1985)
 Gotham (1988)

 Orion Television 
 Forbidden Love (1982)
 The First Time (1982)
 Will There Really Be a Morning? (1983)
 Starflight: The Plane That Couldn't Land (1983)
 This Girl for Hire (1983)
 A Matter of Sex (1984)
 The Blood of Others (1984)
 Victims for Victims: The Theresa Saldana Story (1984)
 Condor (1985)
 Beverly Hills Madam (1986)
 Nazi Hunter: The Beate Klarsfeld Story (1986)
 Babes in Toyland (1986)
 Murder by the Book (1987)
 Return to Green Acres (1990)
 The Love She Sought (1990)

 Filmways 
 Moon of the Wolf (1972)
 Pioneer Woman (1973)
 The Stranger Who Looks Like Me (1974)
 Hustling (1975)
 My Father's House (1975)
 21 Hours at Munich (1976)
 Smash-Up on Interstate 5 (1976)
 Danger in Paradise (1977)
 Mad Bull (1977)
 Flatbed Annie & Sweetiepie: Lady Truckers (1979)
 Anatomy of a Seduction (1979)
 Son-Rise: A Miracle of Love (1979)
 Portrait of a Stripper (1979)
 Disaster on the Coastliner (1979)
 Portrait of an Escort (1980)
 The Babysitter (1980)
 The Big Black Pill (1981)
 The Monkey Mission (1981)
 Miracle on Ice (1981)
 Return of the Rebels (1981)
 Lois Gibbs and the Love Canal (1982)
 In the Custody of Strangers (1982)
 Murder 1, Dancer 0 (1983)

 American International Television 
 The Wild Weird World of Dr. Goldfoot (1965)
 Attack of the Eye Creatures (1967)
 Zontar, The Thing from Venus (1967)
 Curse of the Swamp Creature (1968)
 Mars Needs Women (1968)
 In the Year 2889 (1969)
 Hell Raiders (1969)
 It's Alive (1969)
 Voyage Into Space (1970)
 An Evening of Edgar Allan Poe (1972)
 Cool and the Crazy (1994)

 Fries Entertainment 
 Strange Homecoming (1974)
 The Hatfields and the McCoys (1975)
 The Secret Night Caller (1975)
 Someone I Touched (1975)
 Hey, I'm Alive (1975)
 Foster and Laurie (1975)
 Louis Armstrong: Chicago Style (1976)
 Twin Detective (1976)
 The Call of the Wild (1976)
 The Million Dollar Rip-Off (1976)
 Francis Gary Powers: The True Story of the U-2 Spy Incident (1976)
 How to Break Up a Happy Divorce (1976)
 Stalk the Wild Child (1976)
 Night Drive (aka Night Terror) (1977)
 The Spell (1977)
 Terraces (1977)
 The Trial of Lee Harvey Oswald (1977)
 A Love Affair: The Eleanor and Lou Gehrig Story (1977)
 The Greatest Thing That Almost Happened (1977)
 Halloween with the New Addams Family (1977)
 Intimate Strangers (1977)
 Night Cries (1978)
 The Initiation of Sarah (1978)
 Are You in the House Alone? (1978)
 Human Feelings (1978)
 Crash (1978)
 The Winds of Kitty Hawk (1978)
 Spider-Man Strikes Back (1978)
 The House on Garibaldi Street (1979)
 Spider-Man The Dragon's Challenge (1979)
 The Two Worlds of Jennie Logan (1979)
 Bogie (1980)
 Rage! (1980)
 For the Love of It (1980)
 The Children of An Lac (1980)
 A Cry for Love (1980)
 High Noon, Part II: The Return of Will Kane (1980)
 Leave 'em Laughing (1981)
 Bitter Harvest (1981)
 Twirl (1981)
 The Ambush Murders (1982)
 In Love with an Older Woman (1982)
 Rosie: The Rosemary Clooney Story (1982)
 Cocaine: One Man's Seduction (1983)
 Dempsey (1983)
 Carpool (1983)
 Memorial Day (1983)
 Through Naked Eyes (1983)
 The Zany Adventures of Robin Hood (1984)
 Jealousy (1984)
 Calendar Girl Murders (1984) (produced by Tisch/Avnet Productions)
 The Burning Bed (1984) (produced by Tisch/Avnet Productions)
 Silence of the Heart (1984) (produced by Tisch/Avnet Productions)
 Sins of the Father (1985)
 Starcrossed (1985)
 Toughlove (1985)
 Poison Ivy (1985)
 Bridge Across Time (aka Terror at London Bridge) (1985)
 The Right of the People (1986)
 The Children of Times Square (1986)
 Samaritan: The Mitch Snyder Story (1986)
 Blood Vows: The Story of a Mafia Wife (1987)
 LBJ: The Early Years (1987)
 The Alamo: 13 Days to Glory (1987)
 Timestalkers (1987)
 Fight for Life (1987)
 Deep Dark Secrets (1987)
 Drop-Out Brother (1988)
 Crash Course (1988)
 Double Standard (1988)
 The Case of the Hillside Stranglers (1989)
 Bridge to Silence (1989)
 The Neon Empire (1989)
 Leona Helmsley: The Queen of Mean (1990)
 Absolute Strangers (1991)
 K-9000 (1991)
 Mission of the Shark: The Saga of the U.S.S. Indianapolis (1991)
 Chance of a Lifetime (1991)
 The Last P.O.W.? The Bobby Garwood Story (1993)

 Trans World Entertainment 
 Return to Earth (1976)
 How to Pick Up Girls! (1978)
 Summer of My German Soldier (1978; produced by Highgate Pictures)
 The Intruder Within (1981) 
 Side Show (1981)
 Blood Ties (1986)

 Heritage Entertainment Inc. 
 Stagecoach (1986)

 Samuel Goldwyn Television 
 April Morning (1988)
 Dadah Is Death (1988)

 Dino de Laurentiis Communications 
 Sometimes They Come Back (1991)

 Motion Picture Corporation of America (MPCA) 
 Ring of the Musketeers (1992)
 Sketch Artist (1992)
 Love, Cheat & Steal (1993)

 NBC Studios (international distribution) 
 Mrs. R's Daughter (1979)
 The Last Ride of the Dalton Gang (1979)
 Wait till Your Mother Gets Home! (1983)
 An Early Frost (1985)
 C.A.T. Squad: Stalking Danger (1986)
 Christmas Eve (1986)
 The Abduction of Kari Swenson (1987)
 Assault and Matrimony (1987)
 The Little Match Girl (1987)
 The Child Saver (1988)
 C.A.T. Squad 2: Python Wolf (1988)
 A Father's Homecoming (1988)
 Winnie (1988)
 Flying Blind (1988)
 Take My Daughters, Please (1988)
 I'll Be Home for Christmas (1988)
 Brotherhood of the Rose (1989)
 Those She Left Behind (1989)
 The Gifted One (1989)
 Roe vs. Wade (1989)
 Turn Back the Clock (1989)
 Chameleons (1989)
 Fall from Grace (1990)
 Last Flight Out (1990)
 Kaleidoscope (1990)
 Fine Things (1990)
 Follow Your Heart (1990)
 Changes (1991)
 One Special Victory (1991)
 Danielle Steel's 'Palomino' (1991)
 Daddy (1991)
 In the Best Interest of the Children (1992)
 Secrets (1992)
 In the Shadow of a Killer (1992)
 Cruel Doubt (1992)
 Danger Island (1992)
 Saved by the Bell: Hawaiian Style (1992)
 Shadow of a Stranger (1992)
 Marked for Murder (1993)
 Heartbeat (1993)
 Danielle Steel's Star (1993)
 Double Deception (1993)
 The Secrets of Lake Success (1993)
 Bonanza: The Return (1993)
 Once in a Lifetime (1994)
 One Woman's Courage (1994)
 A Time to Heal (1994)
 Tonya and Nancy: The Inside Story (1994)
 Too Good to Be True (1994)
 A Perfect Stranger (1994)
 Saved by the Bell: Wedding in Las Vegas (1994)
 Roseanne and Tom: Behind the Scenes (1994)
 Bonanza: Under Attack (1995)
 Vanished (1995)
 Awake To Danger (1995)
 Fight for Justice: The Nancy Conn Story (1995)
 She Fought Alone (1995)
 Her Hidden Truth (1995)
 Mixed Blessings (1995)
 No Greater Love (1996)
 Remembrance (1996)
 Full Circle (1996)
 Night Visitors (1996)
 Seduced by Madness (1996)
 Her Last Chance (1996)
 Sweet Dreams (1996)
 The Secret She Carried (1996)
 Friends 'Til the End (1997)
 Asteroid (1997)
 Murder Live! (1997)
 Born Into Exile (1997)
 Killing Mr. Griffin (1997)
 Sleeping with the Devil (1997)
 The World's Wildest Magic (1997)
 Perfect Body (1997)
 Cloned (1997)
 The Tempest (1998)
 I've Been Waiting for You (1998)
 Witness to the Mob (1998)
 The World's Most Dangerous Magic (1998)
 Death Defying Thrills (1998)
 Crime and Punishment (1998)
 Payback (1999)
 The Wrong Girl (1999)
 Vanished Without a Trace (1999)
 The 60's (1999)
 Confirmation: The Hard Evidence of Aliens Among Us? (1999)
 Mutiny (1999)
 The World's Most Dangerous Magic 2 (1999)
 Dave Barlta: Extreme Stuntman (1999)
 Atomic Train (1999)
 The Jesse Ventura Story (1999)
 The Promise (1999)
 Cruel Justice (1999)
 Road Rage (1999)
 A Touch of Hope (1999)
 Countdown to Chaos (1999)
 The David Cassidy Story (2000)
 The Spring (2000)
 The 70's (2000)
 In His Life: The John Lennon Story (2000)
 Submerged (2001)
 Dying to Dance (2001)
 Hunter: Return to Justice (2002)
 It's a Very Merry Muppet Christmas Movie (2002)
 Hunter: Back in Force (2003)
 Critical Assembly (2003)
 Saving Jessica Lynch'' (2003)

See also 
List of libraries owned by Metro-Goldwyn-Mayer

Notes

References 

MGM
Television series

Amazon (company)
MGM